Takaiwa Station (高岩駅) is the name of two train stations in Japan:

 Takaiwa Station (Nagano)
 Takaiwa Station (Nagasaki)